Castle Rock Entertainment is an American film and television production company founded in 1987 by Martin Shafer, director Rob Reiner, Andrew Scheinman, Glenn Padnick and Alan Horn. It is a label of  Warner Bros. Entertainment, itself a subsidiary of Warner Bros. Discovery (WBD).

History

Origin 
Rob Reiner named the company in honor of the fictional Maine town of the same name that serves as the setting of several stories by author Stephen King, which in itself is named after the fictional mountain fort in William Golding's 1954 novel Lord of the Flies.

Reiner and Scheinman already had a production company. They were friends with Shafer, who worked with Horn at 20th Century Fox at the time. Horn was disappointed at Fox and agreed to join the trio in forming the company. Horn brought along Padnick, who was an executive at Embassy Television. In Castle Rock, Horn became the CEO, Shafer ran the film division, Padnick ran television, and Reiner and Scheinman became involved in the development of productions.

The company was originally backed by The Coca-Cola Company, then the parent company of Columbia Pictures. Coca-Cola and Castle Rock's founders jointly owned stakes in the company. Months after the deal, Coca-Cola exited the entertainment business, and was succeeded by Columbia Pictures Entertainment, Inc.

The then-new company, originally called Castle Rock Productions, is targeted to a minimum of 15 features over a 5-year period at a 3-picture a year pace, with support from then-Columbia Pictures CEO David Puttnam, following the box office success of the film Stand by Me, which was produced by Act III Communications (controlled by Reiner's colleague Norman Lear; the film had been in production at Embassy when Lear sold Embassy to Columbia and Lear subsequently paid for production to continue).

Shortly after formation, Castle Rock appointed Nelson Entertainment, the company that owned the domestic home video rights to Reiner's This Is Spinal Tap, The Sure Thing, and The Princess Bride, to join a five-year, eighteen-picture joint venture; this was in addition to a pre-existing pact between Nelson and Columbia for a 3-year, 12-feature deal, in which Columbia would serve as the co-financing entity; Castle Rock would produce fourteen films, while Nelson produced four films themselves.

Under the deal, Nelson also distributed the films on video in North American markets, and handled international theatrical distribution, while Columbia, which Nelson forged a distribution deal with, would receive domestic theatrical distribution rights. Some of Nelson's holdings were later acquired by New Line Cinema, which took over Nelson's duty. Columbia, shortly after the company's formation, thereafter had to re-invest with a substantial change in terms when accumulated losses exhausted its initial funding.

Reiner has stated that Castle Rock's purpose was to allow creative freedom to individuals; a haven away from the pressures of studio executives. Castle Rock was to make films of the highest quality, whether they made or lost money. In 1989, Castle Rock was supported by another backer, Group W, a subsidiary of Westinghouse.

Castle Rock has also produced several television series, most notably the sitcom Seinfeld.

Turner purchase and WarnerMedia ownership 
In August 1993, Turner Broadcasting System agreed to acquire Castle Rock, along with co-financing partner (and eventual Castle Rock corporate sibling) New Line Cinema. The sale was completed on December 22, 1993. The motivation behind the purchase was to allow a stronger company to handle the overhead.

By 1994, Castle Rock launched a foreign sales operation, Castle Rock International, and planned to produce 12 to 15 films annually. Castle Rock also had aspirations to distribute its own films once its deal with Columbia expired in 1998. It was long rumored that Castle Rock's film projects could go to New Line when the deal expired.

Turner Broadcasting merged with Time Warner in 1996. After a failed attempt to divest the company, Time Warner integrated Castle Rock Entertainment into Warner Bros., and cut its production slate to five films per year. On June 27, 1997, Castle Rock's staff was reduced to 60 employees and Castle Rock International was folded into Warner Bros.

In January 1998, Warner Bros. and PolyGram Filmed Entertainment formed a deal to co-finance and co-distribute Castle Rock films; that deal was taken over by Universal Pictures after the studio's parent company Seagram merged with PolyGram later that year. The Warner Bros./Universal deal expired in 2000. On June 19, 2000, after the expiration of the Universal deal, Spanish player Telefónica Media took over its take in the Castle Rock production company. Castle Rock also set up projects with Village Roadshow Pictures and Bel-Air Entertainment, two of Warner Bros.' key production affiliates.

On July 20, 1998, Castle Rock Television took over production of The WB's midseason show Movie Stars, which was set to be in development at Studios USA. In 2001, Castle Rock Television had set up Mission Hill writers Bill Oakley and Josh Weinstein with an overall deal, producing several projects, like an unsold family concept pitch at ABC.

In April 2002, Warner Bros. reduced Castle Rock's budget following a string of box office bombs. Castle Rock fired 16 of its 46 employees, and Castle Rock's physical production and public relations departments, back-office duties, and remaining employees were absorbed into Warner Bros.

Relaunch
In May 2020, Rob and Michelle Reiner signed a deal with Warner Bros. Television Studios, and on October 1 of that year, it relaunched the company. On October 19, 2021, the feature division company was revived with a $175 million film fund under which the studio will develop, produce and finance new movies for global audiences. Reiner will continue as Castle Rock CEO, with Michele Reiner and Matthew George serving as co-presidents. Castle Rock will produce films in a first-look deal with Warner Bros. on theatrical content, which has long been its home, in addition to their existing deal with Castle Rock television productions. In April 2022, Jonathan Fuhrman joined Castle Rock Entertainment as EVP and Head of Business Affairs. He will report to Rob and Michelle Reiner and Matthew George.

Following an addition $170 million investment from Derrick Rossi, Reiner announced his intention to relaunch Castle Rock through two films, one a sequel to his This is Spinal Tap mockumentary, and the other Albert Brooks: Defending My Life documentary, shopping both films at the 2022 Cannes festival.

Ownership of the Castle Rock library 
Warner Bros. owns the copyrights and overall rights to most of the pre-2010 Castle Rock films and television shows, with a few notable exceptions. Metro-Goldwyn-Mayer (MGM) owns the worldwide home video rights (under license to Warner Bros. Home Entertainment since July 1, 2020) to most of the pre-1994 films by virtue of the purchase of the pre-1996 PolyGram Filmed Entertainment/Epic Productions library via Orion Pictures (which had included, in part, the Nelson Entertainment holdings) in 1999. Sony Pictures owns the distribution rights to A Few Good Men, In the Line of Fire, and North, whereas their television division owns the distribution rights to Seinfeld.

Filmography

Citations 

1987 establishments in California
2020 establishments in California
 
1993 mergers and acquisitions
1996 mergers and acquisitions
American companies established in 1987
Mass media companies established in 1987
Film production companies of the United States
American companies established in 2020
Mass media companies established in 2020
Re-established companies
American independent film studios
Warner Bros. divisions
Companies based in Beverly Hills, California
Entertainment companies based in California